Fishery can mean either the enterprise of raising or harvesting fish and other aquatic life; or more commonly, the site where such enterprise takes place (a.k.a. fishing ground).  Commercial fisheries include wild fisheries and fish farms, both in freshwater waterbodies (about 10% of all catch) and the oceans (about 90%). About 500 million people worldwide are economically dependent on fisheries. 171 million tonnes of fish were produced in 2016, but overfishing is an increasing problem — causing declines in some populations. 

Because of their economic and social importance, fisheries are governed by complex fisheries management practices and legal regimes that vary widely across countries. Historically, fisheries were treated with a "first-come, first-served " approach, but recent threats by human overfishing and environmental issues have required increased regulation of fisheries to prevent conflict and increase profitable economic activity on the fishery. Modern jurisdiction over fisheries is often established by a mix of international treaties and local laws. 

Declining fish populations, marine pollution and destruction of important coastal ecosystems has introduced increasing uncertainty in important fisheries worldwide, threatening economic security and food security in many parts of the world. These challenges are further complicated by the changes in the ocean caused by climate change, which may extend the range of some fisheries while dramatically reducing the sustainability of other fisheries.

Definitions 
According to the FAO, "...a fishery is an activity leading to harvesting of fish. It may involve capture of wild fish or raising of fish through aquaculture." It is typically defined in terms of the "people involved, species or type of fish, area of water or seabed, method of fishing, class of boats, purpose of the activities or a combination of the foregoing features". 

The definition often includes a combination of mammal and fish fishers in a region, the latter fishing for similar species with similar gear types. Some government and private organizations, especially those focusing on recreational fishing include in their definitions not only the fishers, but the fish and habitats upon which the fish depend.

The term fish 

 In biology – the term fish is most strictly used to describe any aquatic vertebrate that has gills throughout life and has limbs, if any, in the shape of fins. Many types of aquatic animals commonly referred to as "fish" are not fish in this strict sense; examples include shellfish, cuttlefish, starfish, crayfish and jellyfish. In earlier times, even biologists did not make a distinction—sixteenth century natural historians classified also seals, whales, amphibians, crocodiles, even hippopotamuses, as well as a host of marine invertebrates, as fish.
 In fisheries – the term fish is used as a collective term, and includes mollusks, crustaceans and any aquatic animal which is harvested.
 True fish – The strict biological definition of a fish, above, is sometimes called a true fish. True fish are also referred to as finfish or fin fish to distinguish them from other aquatic life harvested in fisheries or aquaculture.

Types 

The fishing industry which harvests fish from fisheries can be divided into three main sectors: commercial, recreational or subsistence. They can be saltwater or freshwater, wild or farmed. Examples are the salmon fishery of Alaska, the cod fishery off the Lofoten islands, the tuna fishery of the Eastern Pacific, or the shrimp farm fisheries in China. Capture fisheries can be broadly classified as industrial scale, small-scale or artisanal, and recreational.

Close to 90% of the world's fishery catches come from oceans and seas, as opposed to inland waters. These marine catches have remained relatively stable since the mid-nineties (between 80 and 86 million tonnes). Most marine fisheries are based near the coast. This is not only because harvesting from relatively shallow waters is easier than in the open ocean, but also because fish are much more abundant near the coastal shelf, due to the abundance of nutrients available there from coastal upwelling and land runoff. However, productive wild fisheries also exist in open oceans, particularly by seamounts, and inland in lakes and rivers.

Most fisheries are wild fisheries, but farmed fisheries are increasing. Farming can occur in coastal areas, such as with oyster farms, or the aquaculture of salmon, but more typically fish farming occurs inland, in lakes, ponds, tanks and other enclosures.

There are commercial fisheries worldwide for finfish, mollusks, crustaceans and echinoderms, and by extension, aquatic plants such as kelp. However, a very small number of species support the majority of the world's fisheries. Some of these species are herring, cod, anchovy, tuna, flounder, mullet, squid, shrimp, salmon, crab, lobster, oyster and scallops. All except these last four provided a worldwide catch of well over a million tonnes in 1999, with herring and sardines together providing a harvest of over 22 million metric tons in 1999. Many other species are harvested in smaller numbers.

Economic importance 
Directly or indirectly, the livelihood of over 500 million people in developing countries depends on fisheries and aquaculture. Overfishing, including the taking of fish beyond sustainable levels, is reducing fish stocks and employment in many world regions. It was estimated in 2014 that global fisheries were adding US$270 billion a year to global GDP, but by full implementation of sustainable fishing, that figure could rise by as much as US$50 billion. 

In addition to commercial and subsistence fishing, recreational (sport) fishing is popular and economically important in many regions.

Production 

Total fish production in 2016 reached an all-time high of 171 million tonnes, of which 88 percent was utilized for direct human consumption, thanks to relatively stable capture fisheries production, reduced wastage and continued aquaculture growth. This production resulted in a record-high per capita consumption of 20.3 kg in 2016. Since 1961 the annual global growth in fish consumption has been twice as high as population growth. While annual growth of aquaculture has declined in recent years, significant double-digit growth is still recorded in some countries, particularly in Africa and Asia.

FAO predicted in 2018 the following major trends for the period up to 2030:
 World fish production, consumption and trade are expected to increase, but with a growth rate that will slow over time.
 Despite reduced capture fisheries production in China, world capture fisheries production is projected to increase slightly through increased production in other areas if resources are properly managed. Expanding world aquaculture production, although growing more slowly than in the past, is anticipated to fill the supply–demand gap.
 Prices will all increase in nominal terms while declining in real terms, although remaining high.
 Food fish supply will increase in all regions, while per capita fish consumption is expected to decline in Africa, which raises concerns in terms of food security.
 Trade in fish and fish products is expected to increase more slowly than in the past decade, but the share of fish production that is exported is projected to remain stable.

Management

Global goals 
International attention to these issues has been captured in Sustainable Development Goal 14 "Life Below Water" which sets goals for international policy focused on preserving coastal ecosystems and supporting more sustainable economic practices for coastal communities, including in their fishery and aquaculture practices.

Law

Environmental issues

Climate change

See also

 Fisheries co-management
 Fisheries science
 National Fish Habitat Initiative
 Ocean fisheries
 Population dynamics of fisheries
 Regional Fisheries Management Organisation
 Sea Fish Industry Authority
 Tanka people

References

Free content sources

External links

FAO Fisheries Department 
 The Fishery Resources Monitoring System (FIRMS)

 

pt:Pesca
se:Guolásteapmi